Entente Sportive Avignon Basket is a French former basketball club that was based in Avignon. Thereafter, it became the Athletic Union Avignon-Le Pontet Basket, which is the leading club in the city, and becoming in 2014, Grand Avignon Sorgues Basket.

History 
At the end of the 1976-77 season, ES Avignon rose to the French Division 1, under the leadership of its captain, Antoine Cerase, the American Mike Hopwood, and the great French hope of the time, Philippe Szaniel. The club competed for 12 seasons in the elite level championship of France, and had a record of 110 wins, 7 draws, and 199 losses in 316 games.

Notable players 

  Didier Dobbels
  Alain Larrouquis
  Philip Szanyiel
  Franck Cazalon
  Antoine Cerase
  Vince Taylor
  Horace Wyatt
  Tom Snyder
  Pat Burtey
  Bernard Van den Broeck
  Emmanuel Schmitt

References 

Basketball teams in France